is an American-born Japanese actor. He is the son of actor and martial artist Sonny Chiba. Maeda is best known for portraying Takashi Mitsuya in live action movie adaptation of Tokyo Revengers and Issei Kataoka in the romance drama Promise Cinderella.

Early life 
Maeda was born on January 9, 2000, in Los Angeles, California. He is the son of Japanese action actor Sonny Chiba and second wife Tamami. He has one brother Mackenyu and a half-sister Juri Manase from his father's previous marriage. Maeda lived in Beverly Hills for 12 years up to elementary school graduation, before moving to Japan with his mother. His parents divorced in 2015. He learned Kyokushin karate since the age of 5 and continued for 7 years. In elementary school, he was fascinated by saxophone upon his first encounter with the instrument. After entering junior high school in Kyoto, he joined the school's brass band and took a break from karate. It was a period in which he developed his desire to enroll at Tokyo University of the Arts with the goal of becoming professional saxophonist. In order to further pursue his dream he went to Meisei Gakuin, a private senior high school in Okayama which has highly reputable brass band and special course to go professional. He lived in the school dorm in Okayama throughout high school. Together with Meisei Gakuin brass band, he won silver and bronze awards at All-Japan Band Competition in 2016 and 2017. He started to consider going into showbiz after unexpectedly failing his entrance exam for Tokyo University of the Arts. He ultimately put his professional saxophonist dream to rest.

Career 
During a private screening of his brother's movie Over Drive in 2018, through his father he got acquainted with entertainment industry officials including production company ROBOT who offered him to star in youth movie which later become his silver screen debut, Little Love Song. He made his runway debut in Tokyo Girls Collection (TGC) Kitakyushu 2018. He kicked off his acting debut by portraying student band guitarist Shinji Fukumura in music drama movie Little Love Song, released on May 24, 2019. Prior to filming the movie in Okinawa, the casts trained to play band instruments respective to their roles for six months. Maeda joined other cast members for the movie's round of promotion including performing on television music programs Music Station and Love Music as "Chiisana Koi no Uta Band". In July 2019, he starred in sports-themed TV drama No Side Manager as Keita Nanao, an ex-rugby player returnee from New Zealand. He got the role for the drama through three stages of audition. He gained 15 kg in the span of 3 months to prepare for the audition so his body could mimic that of a rugby player.

In January 2022, it was announced that Maeda will be making his first public channel drama leading role in live-action adaptation of Kanakana as former delinquent Masanao Higurashi. During summer 2022, Maeda starred in thriller movie based on popular web novel Karada Sagashi, co-starring Kanna Hashimoto whom he once worked with in 2019 movie Come Kiss Me at 0:00 AM. In July 2022 it was reported that Maeda will appear in Fuji TV fall drama Elpis as young director, Takuro Kishimoto. In the beginning of 2023, Maeda is slated to portray Takeda Katsuyori in NHK Taiga drama What Will You Do, Ieyasu?. This will be his first Taiga drama appearance since debut.

Personal life 
On January 22, 2023 through his official fan club page, Maeda announced that he had married a non-celebrity girlfriend.

Filmography

Television drama

Web drama

Theatrical film

Variety Show

Awards

References

External links 
 
 

2000 births
Living people
American male film actors
American male television actors
Japanese male film actors
American male karateka
Kyokushin kaikan practitioners
Japanese male television actors
21st-century American male actors
21st-century Japanese male actors
American male actors of Japanese descent